Ebba Wilhelmina Modée (1775–1840), was a Swedish noble and courtier, the love interest of king Gustav IV Adolf of Sweden.

She was the daughter of Carl Wilhelm Modée and Ebba Ulrika Sparre af Söfdeborg. She was maid of honor to the Swedish princess Hedwig Elizabeth Charlotte of Holstein-Gottorp from 1794 to 1801, and accompanied her on her trip to Germany and Austria in 1798-99.

In 1795, at the time of his engagement to Duchess Louise Charlotte of Mecklenburg-Schwerin, Gustav IV Adolf fell in love with her. He offered her to end his engagement, abdicate and elope with her to Bohemia. He also had a document of abdication set up, and was ready to make use of it. She declined, and encouraged him on his trip to Russia in 1796, where he was to be engaged to the Grand Duchess Alexandra Pavlovna of Russia; the following year, he married Frederica of Baden.

In 1801, Ebba Modée married the courtier general lieutenant count Axel Otto Mörner, with whom she had long been in love, and because of their poverty, Hedwig Elizabeth Charlotte appointed her lady in waiting.

References 
 Hedvig Elisabet Charlotta; Klercker Cecilia af (1936). Hedvig Elisabeth Charlottas dagbok. 7, 1800-1806. Stockholm: Norstedt. Libris 469167 S. 138, 198, 613.
 Hedvig Elisabet Charlotta; Klercker Cecilia af (1942). Hedvig Elisabeth Charlottas dagbok. 9, 1812-1817. Stockholm: Norstedt. Libris 8207718 S. 711-712
 Ebba Wilhelmina Modée i Wilhelmina Stålberg, Anteckningar om svenska qvinnor (1864)

1775 births
1840 deaths
Swedish ladies-in-waiting
Swedish nobility